"Singappenney" is a 2019 Indian Tamil language song composed and sung by A. R. Rahman, from the film Bigil. The song's lyrics were written by Vivek and featured additional vocals by Shashaa Tirupati. The song has a motivational theme for women, hailed as a women's anthem. The song was released as a first single track of the film on 23 July 2019. The song features Vijay including the 11 women football players. Rahman and Atlee Kumar has a special entrance in the film through this song.

Background 

The making begins with director Atlee and lyricist Vivek asking A. R. Rahman to compose a women's anthem, the former wanting a song to dedicate to all women, and the latter claiming that men are seen as strong while women are seen as delicate and wanting to change that mindset. Rahman plays the verse of the song on his piano; 'Singappenney, singappenney. Aaninamae unnai vanangume.' (Eng: Lion-queen bold. The entire male clan welcomes and salutes you)

Composition 

Singappenney starts with a flute prelude as Rahman and a choir from Rahman's musical group Qutub-E-Kripa singing the first line 'Maadhare' (Eng: Women) followed by beats performed by musician Vuvuri Kumar and a guitar by veteran musician Keba Jeremiah. The song proceeds with vocals provided by children as Rahman sings the hook. The mix of drums, percussion beats and the composer's signature piano set the tune for Rahman's vocals to follow. The composer delivers a good song that is both moving, hip, and catchy in its rhythm and structure.

Rahman sings the song with his high-pitched intonation, with Shashaa Tirupati joining in later with only having a few lines to sing. Tirupati's vocals serve as the chorus or refrain of the song, the song's tune changing as her lines continue the song with the same motivation but in a different tune. The song then ends on a bridge with additional vocals.

Overview 

The music video from the film features the protagonist Michael (Vijay) training the girls' football team for their upcoming match as well as motivating and encouraging them to break the female stereotypes and emerge as their true selves. The song also features Rahman and Atlee in special appearances alongside Vijay during the pre-chorus.

Leaked 
On 16 July 2019, a track from Bigil titled "Singa Penne" found its way to the internet and has gone viral on social media. It has been rumored to be leaked from the filmmakers.

Reception

Critical reception

The Indian Express stated that "throughout the song's punchy six and a half minutes, lyricist Vivek with his catchy lyrics pays ode to the strength of women. The song as we can imagine will be used by Vijay's character in the film to motivate his all-girls football team while training them for probably a crucial match. If you were wondering, Singappenney is Tamil for lioness".
Suhansid Srikanth of Moviecrow praised the song "Vivek's lyrics are endearing about motivating the team women that the lead character nourishes in the film. And, like most of ARR's recent tracks, it is tough to get into the catchy tune that can be hummed or identified as song" while praising Shashaa Tripathi's portion. Behindwoods called it a "highly powerful and energetic song composed of strong beats and tune, Singapenney is a song whose music stays true to the lyrics".

Social media reception
The motivational number has had a wide reach among the fans and has inspired fans to salute the Singappennu (lioness) in their lives.

Using the hashtag SaluteMySingappenney ("#SaluteMySingappenney"), people have taken to Twitter to post pictures of women they admire and are true heroes.

Archana Kalpathi, producer of Bigil, took to the social media platform to encourage followers to use the hashtag and post pictures of incredible women in their lives. 

- Archana Kalpathi, Creative producer of film Bigil, wrote on her Twitter page.

YouTube records
The women anthem has garnered more than 2 million views within 2 hours of its release on YouTube.

The song became fastest music video to get 500k likes on YouTube and also .

Music credits 
Personnel

 Composer & Producer - A. R. Rahman
 Lyrics - Vivek
 Performers - A. R. Rahman, Shashaa Tirupati
 Kids Vocals - Riya K S, Nikhil P S, K R Arjun, Vidhya Rupini, K U Kokilapriya
 Additional Vocals - Arjun Chandy, Nakul Abhyankar, Veena Murali, Deepthi Suresh, Deepak, Soundarya, Niranjana, Swagatha, Sowmya, Aravind Srinivas, Jithin, Shenbagaraj

Musician Credits

Guitars - Keba Jeremiah
Flute - Kareem Kamalakar, Naveen Kumar
Live Rhythm - T Raja, Drums Kumar, Krishna Kishore, P Guberan
Tabla - Sai Saravanam
Additional Rhythm Arrangement - Santhosh Dhayanidhi
Additional Programming - Pawan CH, Hari Dafusia
Choral Arrangement - Arjun Chandy, Nakul Abhyankar

Sound Engineers

 Panchathan Record Inn, Chennai -  T. R. Krishna Chetan, Suresh Permal, Karthik Sekaran, Suryansh, Barath, Riyasdeen Riyan
 AM Studios Chennai - Sivakumar S, Kannan Ganpat, Pradeep Menon, Krishnan Subramaniyan, Manoj Raman, Aravind MS

Production

Mixed By - T. R. Krishna Chetan, Jerry Vincent
Mastered By - Suresh Permal
MFiT - S. Sivakumar
Musicians Co Ordinator - T. M. Faizuddin, Abdul Haiyum, Siddique
Musicians Fixer - Samidurai R
Music Label - Sony Music Entertainment India Pvt. Ltd.

Video credits 
Credits adapted from official music video released by Sony Music South.

 Director & Editor - Amith Krishnan 
 Cinematographer - Vijay Kartik Kannan
 Stylist - Varshini
 Art Director - Saravanan 
 Direction Team - Manojkumar, Ramanathan Sathyamoorthy, Vishal Ravichandran, Suriya Balakumuran
 Costume Designer - Pallavi Singh
 Make-up - Preetisheel Singh
 Assistant Cinematographers - Ilayaraja, Yuvaraj 
 Camera Assistant - Vignesh R 
 Still Photographer - Venket Ram
 Line Producer & Creative Head - Jagadish Palanisamy
 Executive Producer - S. M. Venckat Manickam

Live performance 
A. R. Rahman performed the song at a live concert held in YMCA, Nandanam, Chennai on 10 August 2019, among all the songs played at his concert.

On 27 September 2019, Rahman and his team performed "Singappenney" and all other songs at the Bigil audio launch event, held in Sai Leo Muthu Indoor Stadium, Sri Sairam Engineering College, Chennai where the audio was released.

Chart
Weekly charts

Year-end charts

Accolades

References

External links 
 

Tamil film songs
2019 songs
Tamil-language songs
Songs with music by A. R. Rahman
Indian songs